Women's association football in the Republic of Ireland is governed by the Women's Football Association of Ireland. The WFAI organizes and manages the Republic of Ireland women's national football team, the FAI Women's Cup and the Women's National League as well as various county and regional leagues and junior cup competitions. The most notable county league is the Dublin Women's Soccer League. Organised women's association football has been played in the Republic of Ireland since at least the late 1960s and the national team has been active since 1973. Notable Republic of Ireland women's association footballers include Katie Taylor, Stephanie Roche and Emma Byrne. In addition to representing the Republic of Ireland at full international level, Taylor is also an Irish, European, World and Olympic boxing champion. In 2014 Roche was a FIFA Puskás Award nominee. Byrne is a prominent member of the Arsenal Ladies team.

Timeline

List of teams

Women's National League

Dublin Women's Soccer League

Premier League

Major League

Mayo Women's Football League

See also
 Geography of women's association football

References